Kim Kiyoung is a South Korean judge. He was appointed to Justice of the Constitutional Court of Korea in 2018.

Career 
1996  Judge, Incheon District Court
1998  Judge, Seoul District Court Bukbu Branch
2000  Judge, Daejeon District Court Seosan Branch
2000  Overseas training (Duke University, U.S.)
2001  Judge, Daejeon District Court Nonsan Branch
2003  Judge, Patent Court
2007  Judge, Seoul Central District Court
2009  Presiding Judge, Gwangju District Court
2010  Presiding Judge, Suwon District Court Ansan Branch
2012  Presiding Judge, Seoul Southern District Court
2014  Presiding Judge, Seoul Central District Court
2017  Presiding Judge, Seoul Eastern District Court
2018  Chief Presiding Judge, Seoul Eastern District Court 
2018~ Justice of the Constitutional Court of Korea (since Oct. 18, 2018)

References 

South Korean judges
1968 births
People from Hoengseong County
Living people
Justices of the Constitutional Court of Korea
Seoul National University School of Law alumni